Pancorius taiwanensis is a species of jumping spiders found only in Taiwan. It is a tiny spider with a total length (excluding legs) of only . The densely hairy carapace is dark brown with a large pale, roughly triangular patch centrally. The legs are dark brown with large, prominent spines. The oval abdomen is grey with darker and lighter striations with paler patches on each side at the front.

This species can only be distinguished from the similar Pancorius magnus by study of the genitalia.

References

Salticidae
Spiders described in 2002
Spiders of Taiwan
Endemic fauna of Taiwan